The True Briton was an English weekly magazine published by Fanny Mayne between 1851 and 1854. The magazine had an evangelical stance.

References

External links
 Volume II scanned from Princeton Library

1851 establishments in the United Kingdom
1854 disestablishments in the United Kingdom
Religious magazines published in the United Kingdom
Weekly magazines published in the United Kingdom
Defunct magazines published in the United Kingdom
Magazines published in England
Magazines established in 1851
Magazines disestablished in 1854